Wang Xianyuan (王憲嫄) (427 – October 9, 464), formally Empress Wenmu (文穆皇后, literally "the civil and solemn empress"), was an empress of the Chinese Liu Song dynasty. Her husband was Emperor Xiaowu (Liu Jun).

Background 
Wang Xianyuan came from a noble family, as her father Wang Yan (王偃) was a great-great-grandson of the famed Jin prime minister Wang Dao. Wang Yan's father Wang Gu (王嘏) was a Jin minister; Yan's mother was Princess Poyang, a daughter of Emperor Xiaowu of Jin. Wang Yan's wife was also a princess—Liu Rongnan (劉榮男), the Princess Wuxing, daughter of Liu Song's founder Emperor Wu. (It is not clear if she was Wang Xianyuan's mother.)

Wang Xianyuan married Liu Jun in 443, when he was the Prince of Wuling under his father Emperor Wen, and she therefore carried the title Princess of Wuling. She was much favored by Liu Jun, and they had at least six children—his two oldest sons Liu Ziye and Liu Zishang (劉子尚), and daughters Liu Chuyu, Liu Chupei (劉楚佩), Liu Chuxiu (劉楚琇), and Liu Xiuming (劉脩明).

As empress consort 
After Liu Jun's older brother Liu Shao the Crown Prince assassinated their father Emperor Wen in 453 and took over the throne himself, Liu Jun started an uprising, and later that year captured and killed Liu Shao, taking the throne himself as Emperor Xiaowu. During the campaign, Princess Wang remained at his defense post Xunyang (尋陽, in modern Jiujiang, Jiangxi) and did not accompany him in attacking the capital Jiankang, although upon his victory she and his mother Consort Lu Huinan were welcomed to the capital, and Princess Wang was created empress.  In 454, he created her son Liu Ziye crown prince.

Little is known about Empress Wang's life during her husband's reign.  However, he had a large number of concubines, and was also said to be so sexually immoral that he had a number of incestuous liaisons—including with the daughters of his uncle Liu Yixuan (劉義宣) the Prince of Nan Commandery, and according to the Book of Song, rumors at the time suggested that even with his own mother Empress Dowager Lu. One of Liu Yixuan's daughters, whom Emperor Xiaowu gave the alias Consort Yin (claiming her to be a relative of his official Yin Yan (殷琰)), was particularly favored by Emperor Xiaowu, and Empress Wang's own favor in Emperor Xiaowu's eyes appeared to have greatly decreased. However, Empress Wang's position appeared to never have been threatened, even though her husband at times considered replacing her impulsive son Liu Ziye as crown prince with Consort Yin's son Liu Ziluan (劉子鸞) the Prince of Xin'an. A rare reference to herself was in 460, when she presided over a ceremony where she personally fed mulberry leaves to silkworms, to show the imperial household's attention to farming. Empress Dowager Lu was in attendance.

In 464, Emperor Xiaowu died.  Liu Ziye succeeded him (as Emperor Qianfei).  He honored Empress Wang as empress dowager.

As empress dowager 
Emperor Qianfei immediately showed himself to be a cruel and arbitrary ruler, and there was little Empress Dowager Wang could do to control her son. In fall 464, she grew seriously ill, and she asked that Emperor Qianfei be summoned. He refused—stating that in sick people's rooms there would be ghosts, and he could not go.  In anger, she told her servant girls, "Bring a sword and cut me open, to see how it is this animal came out of me!" She soon died and was buried with her husband Emperor Xiaowu.

Notes 

Liu Song empresses
427 births
464 deaths